Waxy-monkey treefrog is a common name for the following frog species:

 Phyllomedusa bicolor
 Phyllomedusa sauvagii